Riverview is an OC Transpo transit station located in the Riverside South community in Ottawa, Ontario. The station is located south of Earl Armstrong Road east of River Road.

Riverview was officially designated as a Transitway station in the 2009 system map and was part of an eventual rapid transit corridor that would link with the existing Southeast Transitway that ends at Hunt Club Road and South Keys Shopping Centre. The corridor was intended for a previous light-rail extension towards Riverside South which was cancelled in 2006.

The station is located just across from the Vimy Memorial Bridge which was completed in July 2014 and connects Riverside South with Barrhaven across the Rideau River. A rapid transit corridor along Strandherd Drive and Earl Armstrong Road is planned and would eventually connect to the Southwest Transitway near Greenbank Road and Strandherd Drive. Route 74, which previously started and ended at Nepean Woods station, was extended to/from Riverview station via the Vimy Memorial Bridge until it reverted to previous routing in June of 2021; route 99 was also extended to Barrhaven Centre station (and later CitiGate on select trips) from its previous southwest terminus here at Riverview.

A park and ride facility with 155 parking spaces is operational at this station. A temporary park and ride area was built in the northwest corridor of River and Earl Armstrong until the completion of the permanent facility.

A dedicated rapid transit corridor is currently zoned and protected by the City of Ottawa in its Ultimate Concept Transportation Master Plan which would connect Riverview through residential areas south of Earl Armstrong Road to the Trillium Line terminus at Limebank station.

The station is not to be confused with the neighbourhood of Riverview, which is located in another part of the city.

Service

The following routes currently serve Riverview:

Only 1 school trip from Route  serves this station during PM hours only.
Route  is available at the intersection of Brian Good Avenue and Earl Armstrong Road but does not serve this station.
School route  is available at the intersection of Brian Good Avenue and Earl Armstrong Road but does not serve this station directly

References

2009 establishments in Ontario
Transitway (Ottawa) stations